King's Creek is a stream in Talbot County, Maryland, running for about . It flows into the Choptank River and thence into Chesapeake Bay.

See also
List of rivers of Maryland

References

Rivers of Maryland
Tributaries of the Chesapeake Bay